Frederick Winthrop (August 3, 1839 – April 1, 1865) was an American Union Colonel during the period of the American Civil War.  General Winthrop, an officer in the Union Army, was killed at the Battle of Five Forks about one week before General Robert E. Lee surrendered his army following the Battle of Appomattox Court House. Winthrop joined the Army of the Potomac on April 11, 1862, participating in most of its famous battles. Winthrop had been a brevet brigadier general at the time of his death.  Winthrop received his appointment as brevet major general dated to April 1, 1865.

He was a brother of New York City banker Robert Winthrop.  His nephew Beekman Winthrop served as Governor of Puerto Rico, Assistant Secretary of the Treasury, and Assistant Secretary of the Navy.

He is buried in Green-Wood Cemetery in Brooklyn, New York.

See also

List of American Civil War brevet generals (Union)

References

External links
 

Union Army colonels
1839 births
1865 deaths
Union military personnel killed in the American Civil War